Events from the year 1623 in France.

Incumbents 
Monarch: Louis XIII

Events
 
 
 
 
 
 

 February – France, Savoy, and Venice sign the Treaty of Paris, agreeing to cooperate in removing Spanish forces from the strategic Alpine pass of Valtelline.

Births
 

 
 30 April – François de Laval, first bishop of New France (d. 1708)
 19 June – Blaise Pascal, French mathematician, physicist, and philosopher (d. 1662)

Deaths
 

 
 25 March – Henri de La Tour d'Auvergne, vicomte de Turenne, duc de Bouillon (b. 1555)

See also

References

1620s in France